The CEBL Player of the Year Award, also referred to as the CEBL Most Valuable Player, is an annual award given to the most valuable player in the Canadian Elite Basketball League. Since the establishment of the league in 2019, the award has been given annually. Xavier Moon won the first three awards.

Winners

Awards by player

References

Most valuable player awards
Canadian Elite Basketball League